William Wallace Bowers (October 20, 1834 – May 2, 1917) was an American Civil War veteran politician a U.S. Representative from California from 1891 to 1897.

Biography 
Born in Whitestown, New York, Bowers attended the common schools. He moved to Wisconsin in 1854.

During the American Civil War, he enlisted as a private in Company I, First Wisconsin Cavalry, on February 22, 1862. He was discharged from the service as second sergeant February 22, 1865.

He moved to San Diego, California, in 1869 where he engaged in ranching and served as a member of the California State Assembly in 1873 and 1874. He was appointed collector of customs of the port of San Diego, California, September 25, 1874, and served until his resignation on February 3, 1879. He owned and operated a hotel in San Diego from 1884 to 1891, and served as member of the California State Senate from 1887 to 1889.

Congress 
Bowers was elected as a Republican to the Fifty-second, Fifty-third, and Fifty-fourth Congresses (March 4, 1891 – March 3, 1897). He served as chairman of the Committee on Revision of the Laws (Fifty-fourth Congress). He was an unsuccessful candidate for reelection in 1896 to the Fifty-fifth Congress.

After Congress 
He was again appointed collector of customs of the port of San Diego, California, on March 15, 1902, and served until March 4, 1906.

Death
Bowers resided in San Diego in retirement until his death there on May 2, 1917. He was interred in the Masonic Cemetery.

References

External links
Join California William W. Bowers

1834 births
1917 deaths
Republican Party members of the California State Assembly
Republican Party California state senators
Republican Party members of the United States House of Representatives from California
People from San Diego
People from Whitestown, New York
19th-century American politicians